The 2018–19 Portland State Vikings men's basketball team represented Portland State University during the 2018–19 NCAA Division I men's basketball season. The Vikings, led by second-year head coach Barret Peery, played their return home games at Viking Pavilion in Portland, Oregon after a one year renovation, as members of the Big Sky Conference. They finished the season 16–16, 11–9 in Big Sky play to finish in a three-way tie for fourth place. They lost in the quarterfinals of the Big Sky tournament to Weber State.

Previous season
The Vikings finished the 2017–18 season 20–14, 9–9 in Big Sky play to finish in a tie for sixth place. They defeated Sacramento State in the first round of the Big Sky tournament before losing in the quarterfinals to Eastern Washington. They were invited to the CollegeInsider.com Tournament where, after a first round bye, lost in the second round to San Diego.

Offseason

Departures

Incoming transfers

2018 recruiting class

2019 recruiting class

Roster

Schedule and results

|-
!colspan=9 style=| Exhibition

|-
!colspan=9 style=| Non-conference regular season

|-
!colspan=9 style=| Big Sky regular season

|-
!colspan=9 style=| Big Sky tournament

See also
2018–19 Portland State Vikings women's basketball team

References

Portland State Vikings men's basketball seasons
Portland State
Portland State Vikings men's basketball
Portland State Vikings men's basketball